Duganella phyllosphaerae is a bacterium from the genus Duganella in the Oxalobacteraceae family which was isolated from the leaf surface of Trifolium repens in Germany. D. phyllosphaerae is a bright-yellow pigmented bacterium.

References

External links
Type strain of Duganella phyllosphaerae at BacDive -  the Bacterial Diversity Metadatabase

Burkholderiales
Bacteria described in 2012